William W. Irvin (April 5, 1779  – March 27, 1842) also spelled Irwin was a lawyer, farmer, politician, and two-term U.S. Representative from Ohio from 1829 to 1833.

Biography 
Born near Charlottesville, Virginia, Irvin pursued an academic course and later studied law. He was admitted to the bar in 1800 and commenced practice in his native county. He moved to Lancaster, Ohio, about 1801 and continued the practice of his profession.

He was appointed by an April 9, 1803 joint session of the Ohio Senate and Ohio House to serve as an associate judge of the court of common pleas for Fairfield County by the first general assembly. He was impeached in on February 22, 1805 by the Ohio House of Representatives. His impeachment trial before the Ohio Senate began on December 9, 1805, and  he was convicted and removed from by an 11–4 vote on January 11, 1806.

Irvin served as member of the Ohio House of Representatives in 1806 and 1807, and was a justice of the Supreme Court of Ohio from 1810 to 1815. He finished third in election for Governor of Ohio in 1822. He was again a member of the Ohio House of Representatives 1825-27 and served as speaker in 1825 and 1826. He came in third for election to the United States Senate in 1827, losing to Benjamin Ruggles.

Irvin was elected as a Jacksonian to the Twenty-first and Twenty-second Congresses (March 4, 1829 – March 3, 1833). He was an unsuccessful candidate for reelection in 1832 to the Twenty-third Congress.

He returned to his farm near Lancaster and engaged in agricultural pursuits until his death on March 27, 1842.

Irvin was married to Elizabeth B. Gillespie in Lancaster on February 2, 1813. They had seven children.

Notes

Sources

External links

1779 births
1842 deaths
19th-century American politicians
Impeached United States judges removed from office by state or territorial governments
Jacksonian members of the United States House of Representatives from Ohio
Justices of the Ohio Supreme Court
Members of the Ohio House of Representatives
Ohio lawyers
Ohio state court judges
People from Lancaster, Ohio
Politicians from Charlottesville, Virginia
Speakers of the Ohio House of Representatives